Northern Tibet volcanic field is a volcanic field in China.

Geography and geomorphology 

The volcanic field lies in the Quiangtang plateau, in northern Tibet and the Kunlun mountains. The high altitude, bad terrain and weather make geologic investigations in the region difficult. The volcanic field partly covers the Kangtuo formation.

Local 

The Bamaoqiongzong, Yongbohu and Qiangbaqian fields featured Hawaiian eruptions that have formed lava flows. Later erosion has reduced these to flat topped conical hills and table mountains. Other volcanic centres are the cones of Heiguotou, Kushuihuan-Beishan and Yuyiehu. In addition, the Kekexili caldera is considered part of the field. A volcano named "Debussey" is supposedly also located there.

It forms a  peak with column-jointed rocks at its top. It is surrounded by lava domes and lava sheets.

One has the shape of a dragon and another one is conical. These volcanics are also known as Yulinshan formation. Sometimes, the chronologically, petrologically and geographically distinct Hoh Xil volcanics are grouped with these fields.

Composition 

Bamaoqiongzong, Yongbohu and Qiangbaqian have erupted vitrophyric rocks. Minerals encountered in the vulcanites include andesite, trachyandesite and dacite containing augite, and are subalkaline. Bamaoqiongzong is potassic, it also contains phonolite and its minerals include aegyrite, alkali feldspar, analcite,  foidite, leucite, noselite and titanaugite. This differences may be caused by the position of the centres with respect to the north Tibet block; the last two centres are located on its margin and the first one inside the block.

Eruptive history 

The Bamaoqiongzong, Yongbohu and Qiangbaqian volcanoes appear to be of Quaternary age, seeing as their deposits lie above Pliocene-Pleistocene rocks. Lava flows from Bamaoqiongzong lie on Quaternary lake deposits. Argon-argon dating has yielded ages of 30-26, 18 and 15-14 million years ago for the fields respectively however. Potassium-argon dating of Bamaoqiongzong has yielded ages ranging from 20 to 28.6 million years ago.

There is no evidence for Holocene eruptions. A satellite photo supposedly showing activity from a crater on a  cone on the ring fault of the Kekexili caldera in 1973 was later discarded.

References

Sources

Notes 

Miocene volcanoes
Volcanoes of China
Volcanic fields